Dąbrowiec  is a village in the administrative district of Gmina Żary, within Żary County, Lubusz Voivodeship, in western Poland.

The village has a population of 80.

References

Villages in Żary County